Khurshid Urf Firoj Ahmad is an Indian politician in the Janata Dal (United) party, previously serving as the Minister for Minority Welfare and Sugar Cane Industries in the Government of Bihar under Nitish Kumar. He was elected a member of the  Bihar Legislative Assembly from Sikta in Nov. 2005 and 2015. In the 2020 assembly election Mr. Khurshid lost the election and held the third position.

References

Living people
Janata Dal (United) politicians
Year of birth missing (living people)
Bihar MLAs 2015–2020
Bihar MLAs 2020–2025